Leo "Bud" Welch (March 22, 1932 – December 19, 2017) was an American gospel blues musician and guitarist. He started his music career in 2014, with the release of the album Sabougla Voices by Big Legal Mess Records. His subsequent studio album, I Don't Prefer No Blues, also recorded for Big Legal Mess, was released in 2015.

Early life
Welch was born on March 22, 1932, in the town of Sabougla, Mississippi. He was a lumberjack for 30 years while he learned his musical craft in the Mississippi Delta, where he learned to play various instruments, including the fiddle, harmonica, and guitar.

Music career
His music recording career started in 2014, after he was secretly recorded performing at his manager's birthday party.  He released his first album, Sabougla Voices, on the Fat Possum label. The subsequent album, I Don't Prefer No Blues, was released by Big Legal Mess on March 24, 2015.

His 2019 release, The Angels in Heaven Done Signed My Name, was chosen as a 'Favorite Blues Album' by AllMusic.

Late Blossom Blues
The award-winning feature documentary Late Blossom Blues (Ö/US, 2017) by Austrian filmmakers Wolfgang Pfoser-Almer and Stefan Wolner is a portrait of Welch.

Cameo
Welch made a brief appearance in a documentary about Elvis Presley called The King, directed by American filmmaker Eugene Jarecki.

Death
Welch died at his home in Bruce, Mississippi on December 19, 2017, aged 85.

Discography
 Sabougla Voices (January 6, 2014, Fat Possum / Big Legal Mess)
 I Don't Prefer No Blues (March 24, 2015, Fat Possum / Big Legal Mess)
 Live at The Iridium (March 31, 2017, Cleopatra Blues)
 The Final Session (December 21, 2017, Cleopatra Blues)
 The Angels in Heaven Done Signed My Name (March 8, 2019, Easy Eye Sound)
 Don't Let the Devil Ride (April 12, 2019, Fms Fenn Music)

References

External links

Late Blossom Blues Website

1932 births
2017 deaths
African-American songwriters
African-American Christians
Musicians from Mississippi
Songwriters from Mississippi
People from Calhoun County, Mississippi
People from Bruce, Mississippi
20th-century African-American people
21st-century African-American people
Cleopatra Records artists
Fat Possum Records artists